Paanch (English: Five) is a 2003 Indian crime thriller film written and directed by Anurag Kashyap in his directing debut, starring Kay Kay Menon, Aditya Srivastava, Vijay Maurya, Joy Fernandes, and Tejaswini Kolhapure. The film is "loosely" based on the 1976–77 Joshi-Abhyankar serial murders in Pune.

The film never got a theatrical or home-video release. The Central Board of Film Certification objected to the film's violence, depiction of drug abuse, and bad language. After some cuts, the film was cleared in 2001. However, it could not be released as the producer faced problems. It was later made available through torrent websites. The film was then screened at several film festivals.

Plot

Four friends, namely, Luke Morisson, Murgi, Joy and Pondy, play together in a band along with a fifth female member named Shiuli. They are self-destructing youngsters. Luke, the lead singer and self-imposed leader of the pack ensures his dominance in the group by providing accommodation, drugs, and food for his wasted and broke friends. Pondy is fascinated by Shiuli who sleeps with rich guys for money. The movie revolves around a kidnapping plot gone wrong, in which the four male band members plan to kidnap another friend Nikhil. Nikhil is part of the plot, and agrees to get himself kidnapped to extract money out of his rich but miserly father. In the process, the excess of drugs and uncontrolled anger leads to the murder of Nikhil by Luke. Luke blackmails all others and ensures that nobody leaves or confides into the cops. Meanwhile, Shiuli also gets entangled in the plot. The money hungry youngsters then go on to kill the father of Nikhil and a cop investigating the murder. The plot thickens with a set of betrayal and counter-betrayal leading to an interesting end.

Cast
 Kay Kay Menon as Luke Morrison
 Aditya Srivastava as Murgi
 Vijay Maurya as Pondy
 Joy Fernandes as Joy
 Tejaswini Kolhapure as Shiuli
 Sharat Saxena as Inspector Deshpande
 Pankaj Saraswat as Nikhil Ranjan
 Vijay Raaz as Anish Ranjan
 Abhinav Kashyap as Police Salam

Soundtrack
The soundtrack of the film features music composed by Vishal Bhardwaj and lyrics written by Abbas Tyrewala. The album was released by BMG Crescendo in May 2002, and marked the entry of the music publisher into the Hindi film music market.

Production
In September 1993, while Kashyap stayed at the St. Xavier's Boys Hostel, he used to hang out with Adam Avil, Eddie Avil, Luke Kenny and Ulysses Veyra the members of a band—Greek (later Pralay). He took copious notes on how they lead their lives—forty pages of a small notebook, and began writing the script—"in bits and pieces"—for a film that he called Mirage, but which would later become Paanch. Kashyap had seen ex-VJ Luke Kenny in a Vikram Kapadia play, and approached him with an incomplete script, but nothing came out of it. Anurag Kashyap Interview Excerpts from the interview (in Hindi) conducted by Pravesh Bhardwaj and Ajay Brahmatmaj Later on, while working with Nair, he came across files related to the Joshi-Abhyankar Serial Murders that took place in Pune in 1976.

He had also seen a film, Fun (1995), about two mentally unstable girls murdering an elderly woman. Kashyap says—

Film festival premiere
Paanch was screened at Filmfest Hamburg in 2003, Osian's Cinefan Festival of Asian and Arab Cinema as closing film in 2005, Indian Film Festival of Los Angeles in 2006 and at Jagran Film Festival in 2016.

References

External links

Paanch at Indian Film Festival of Los Angeles portal
Paanch at Jagran Film Festival portal

2003 films
Unreleased Hindi-language films
Indian films based on actual events
Crime films based on actual events
M
Indian crime thriller films
2000s Hindi-language films
Films directed by Anurag Kashyap
Films set in 1976
Films set in 1977
Films scored by Vishal Bhardwaj
Films with screenplays by Anurag Kashyap
2003 directorial debut films